Jacobus Evangelical Lutheran Church is a historic church on Mays Landing Road and Route 54 in Folsom, Atlantic County, New Jersey, United States.

It was built in 1852 and added to the National Register of Historic Places in 1988.

See also
 National Register of Historic Places listings in Atlantic County, New Jersey

References

Churches on the National Register of Historic Places in New Jersey
Churches in Atlantic County, New Jersey
Lutheran churches in New Jersey
National Register of Historic Places in Atlantic County, New Jersey
New Jersey Register of Historic Places
Churches completed in 1852
1852 establishments in New Jersey
Folsom, New Jersey
Greek Revival church buildings in New Jersey
Queen Anne architecture in New Jersey